Trevor Waite is an English film editor.

Selected filmography
Julius Caesar (2012)
The Kid (2010)
Red Riding: The Year of Our Lord 1983 (2009)
Einstein and Eddington (2008)
Is Anybody There? (2008)
And When Did You Last See Your Father? (2007)
The Girls Who Came to Stay (2006)
Driving Lessons (2006)
Bloodlines (2005)
Beyond the Sea (2004)
Hawking (2004)
Octane (2003)
Once Upon a Time in the Midlands (2002)
24 Hour Party People (2002)
The Claim (2000)
With or Without You (1999)
Wonderland (1999)
The War Zone (1999)
I Want You (1998)
Welcome to Sarajevo (1997)
Jude (1996)
Go Now (1995)
Butterfly Kiss (1995)
Family (1994)
A Question of Guilt (1993)
Fool's Gold: The Story of the Brink's-Mat Robbery (1992)
Gawain and the Green Knight (1991)
Somewhere to Run (1989)

External links

English film editors
Living people
1943 births